The Mittaghorn is a  mountain in the Bernese Alps.

It may also refer to:

Mittaghorn (Rawilpass), a mountain near the Rawil Pass
Mittaghorn (SaasFee), a mountain in the Swiss Pennine Alps
Rappehorn, a mountain in the Lepontine Alps